KRDH may refer to:

 KRDH-LD, a low-power television station (channel 5) licensed to serve Cripple Creek, etc., Colorado, United States
 KWJB, a radio station (1510 AM) licensed to serve Canton, Texas, United States, which held the call sign KRDH from 2007 to 2012